Norway has participated in every edition of the World Athletics Championships since 1980.

Medalists

Medal tables

By championships

By event

By gender

References 

Nations at the World Athletics Championships
Athletics in Norway